Gwyn Morgan is a Canadian businessman. The name may also refer to:
Gwyn Morgan (writer) (born 1954), Welsh writer
Gwyn Morgan (civil servant) (1934 – 2010), British Labour Party official and EU diplomat

See also 
Gwyn Morgans (born 1932), Welsh former professional footballer